Pattakkathi Bhairavan is a 1979 Indian Tamil-language action film, starring Sivaji Ganesan, Jai Ganesh, Sridevi and Jayasudha. It is a remake of the 1978 Telugu film Katakataala Rudrayya. The film was released on 19 October 1979.

Plot 

Pattakkathi Bhairavan is a notorious criminal sought by the police for several murders which he commits using his customary pattakkathi (gauntlet-sword). When in jail, he encounters his adopted father and after an escapade he murders his boss Dharmalingam, who had ruined his adopted family. He also reunites with his step-sister Deepa and camouflages himself as Karnan, a rich businessman to deceive the Police. Deepa's close friend Roopa is Bhairavan's romantic interest, but in a twist, Deepa herself is in love with police officer Arjunan, who is actually on a mission to find and eliminate the elusive Pattakkathi Bhairavan. Bhairavan approaches Arjunan quite convincingly masquerading as businessman Karnan, but Arjunan's mother Malathi realizes Bhairavan/Karnan is none other than her own first son whom she had borne out of wedlock, but struggles to tell him the truth, since he professes a profound hatred for his unknown mother, who he believes had dumped him in a garbage bin as a baby. How the events unfold form the rest of the story.

Cast 
 Sivaji Ganesan as Bhairavan/Karnan
 Jayasudha as Roopa
 Sridevi as Deepa
 Sowcar Janaki as Malathi
 Jai Ganesh as Arjunan
 R. S. Manohar as Dharmalingam
 Thengai Srinivasan
 Major Sundarrajan
 A. R. Srinivasan
 Pushpalatha
 Poornam Viswanathan
 Usilai Mani

Soundtrack 
The music was composed by Ilaiyaraaja, with lyrics by Kannadasan.

Reception 
Kausikan of Kalki felt the pattakkathi (gauntlet-sword) failed to shine.

References

External links 
 

1970s Tamil-language films
1979 action films
1979 films
Films directed by V. B. Rajendra Prasad
Films scored by Ilaiyaraaja
Indian action films
Tamil remakes of Telugu films